Aleksandr Kirillovich Silyanov (born 17 February 2001) is a Russian football player who plays as a right-back or centre-back for FC Rostov on loan from FC Lokomotiv Moscow and the Russia national team.

Club career
He made his debut for the senior squad of FC Lokomotiv Moscow on 9 December 2020 in a Champions League game against Bayern Munich, he substituted Dmitri Rybchinsky in the 88th minute.

He made his Russian Premier League debut for Lokomotiv on 11 April 2021 in a game against FC Spartak Moscow, as a starter.

On 18 January 2022, he joined FC Rostov on loan until the end of the 2021–22 season. The loan was renewed for the 2022–23 season on 4 July 2022.

International career
Silyanov was called up to the Russia national football team for the first time for a friendly against Kyrgyzstan in September 2022. He made his debut in that game on 24 September 2022.

Career statistics

Club

International

References

External links
 
 

2001 births
Footballers from Moscow
Living people
Russian footballers
Russia youth international footballers
Russia under-21 international footballers
Russia international footballers
Association football defenders
PFC CSKA Moscow players
FC Lokomotiv Moscow players
FC Rostov players
Russian Premier League players
Russian Second League players